Newstead Station was opened on Tuesday, 7 July 1874.
Although no longer in use, Newstead retains a bricks station building, booking office, platform and goods shed. 
On Friday 17 December 2004, the line from Moolort to Maldon junction was closed, due to the line being reserved for the Victorian Goldfields Railway to operate between Maldon and Castlemaine.

References

External links
 Railpage - Newstead Railway Station
 Vicrail Newstead
 Vicsig Newstead
 Vicsig Castlemain
 Melway map at street-directory.com.au

Disused railway stations in Victoria (Australia)